UFC 121: Lesnar vs. Velasquez was a mixed martial arts event held by the Ultimate Fighting Championship on October 23, 2010 at the Honda Center in Anaheim, California, United States. The event was the fourth time the UFC has hosted at the Honda Center (formerly Arrowhead Pond) in Anaheim, California following UFC 59, UFC 63 and UFC 76 and the sixth event held in the Greater Los Angeles Area along with UFC 60 and UFC 104.

Background
Just like UFC 111, UFC 115, and UFC 118, UFC 121 was shown in movie theaters around the United States by NCM Fathom. UFC 121 featured the return of preliminary fights live on Spike TV. UFC Primetime also returned to promote the Brock Lesnar vs. Cain Velasquez title fight.

Jon Madsen was expected to face Todd Duffee, but Duffee was forced off the card with a lingering knee injury and replaced by Gilbert Yvel. The event was notable for the post-fight confrontation between professional wrestler The Undertaker and Brock Lesnar following Lesnar's loss to Cain Velasquez.

Results

Bonus awards
Fighters were awarded $70,000 bonuses.

Fight of the Night: Diego Sanchez vs. Paulo Thiago
Knockout of the Night: Cain Velasquez
Submission of the Night: Daniel Roberts

Reported payout
The following is the reported payout to the fighters as reported to the California State Athletic Commission. It does not include sponsor money or "locker room" bonuses often given by the UFC and also do not include the UFC's traditional "fight night" bonuses.

Cain Velasquez: $200,000 ($100,000 win bonus) def. Brock Lesnar: $400,000
Jake Shields: $150,000 ($75,000 win bonus) def. Martin Kampmann: $27,000
Diego Sanchez: $100,000 ($50,000 win bonus) def. Paulo Thiago: $18,000
Matt Hamill: $58,000 ($29,000 win bonus) def. Tito Ortiz: $250,000
Brendan Schaub: $20,000 ($10,000 win bonus) def. Gabriel Gonzaga: $67,000
Court McGee: $30,000 ($15,000 win bonus) def. Ryan Jensen: $10,000
Tom Lawlor: $20,000 ($10,000 win bonus) def. Patrick Cote: $21,000
Daniel Roberts: $16,000 ($8,000 win bonus) def. Mike Guymon: $8,000
Sam Stout: $32,000 ($16,000 win bonus) def. Paul Taylor: $16,000
Chris Camozzi: $16,000 ($8,000 win bonus) def. Dong Yi Yang: $8,000
Jon Madsen: $16,000 ($8,000 win bonus) def. Gilbert Yvel: $30,000

Aftermath
On October 4, 2019, Velasquez made his WWE debut confronting Lesnar on the first episode of Friday Night SmackDown on Fox, thus setting up the match at Crown Jewel for the WWE Championship where Lesnar defeated Velasquez in 88 seconds.

See also
 Ultimate Fighting Championship
 List of UFC champions
 List of UFC events
 2010 in UFC

References

Ultimate Fighting Championship events
Events in Anaheim, California
2010 in mixed martial arts
Mixed martial arts in Anaheim, California
Sports competitions in Anaheim, California
2010 in sports in California